Corrales District is one of the six districts of the province Tumbes in Peru.

References